The Savannah Region is one of the newest regions of Ghana and yet the largest region in the country. The creation of the Region follows presentation of a petition by the Gonja Traditional Council, led by the Yagbonwura Tumtumba Boresa Jakpa I. Upon receiving favourable responses from all stakeholders in the Northern Region (the region it was broken off from), the Brobbey Commission (the Commission tasked with the creation of the new regions), a referendum was conducted on the 27th December 2018. The result was a resounding yes of 99.7%. The President of the Republic of Ghana signed and presented the Constitutional Instrument (CI) 115 to the Yagbonwura in the Jubilee House, Accra on 12 February 2019. The launch was well attended by sons and daughters of Gonjaland including all current and past Mps, MDCEs and all appointees with Gonjaland descent. Damongo was declared the capital of the new Savannah Region. 
It is located in the north of the country. The Savannah Region is divided into 7 districts; Bole, Central Gonja, North Gonja, East Gonja, Sawla/Tuna/Kalba, West Gonja, North East Gonja and 7 Constituencies; Bole/Bamboi, Damongo, Daboya/Mankarigu, Salaga North, Salaga South, Sawla/Tuna/Kalba and Yapei/Kusawgu. The capital of Bole district is Bole; East Gonja municipal is Salaga; West Gonja district is Damango; Sawla Tuna Kalba district  is Salwa; Central Gonja is Buipe; North Gonja is Daboya; and North East Gonja is Kpalbe

History
A referendum on 27 December 2018 approved the creation of Savannah Region, with 206,350 (99.52%) votes in favour on a turnout of 81.77%.
CI 115 establishing the Region signed and presented on 12 February 2019.

Geography and climate

Location and size.
The Savannah Region is bordered on the north by the Upper West region, on the west by the Ghana-Côte d'Ivoire international border, on the south by the Bono and Bono East regions, and on the west by the North East and Northern regions. Savannah region is made up of 7 districts.

Climate and vegetation
The Savannah Region is much drier than southern areas of Ghana, due to its proximity to the Sahel, and the Sahara. The vegetation consists predominantly of grassland, especially savanna with clusters of drought-resistant trees such as baobabs or acacias. Between December and April is the dry season. The wet season is between about July and November with an average annual rainfall of 750 to 1050 mm (30 to 40 inches). The highest temperatures are reached at the end of the dry season, the lowest in December and January. However, the hot Harmattan wind from the Sahara blows frequently between December and the beginning of February. The temperatures can vary between 14 °C (59 °F) at night and 40 °C (104 °F) during the day.

Tourism & Parks

Mole National Park
Bui National Park (now defunct due to Bui National Dam)
Larabanga Historic Mosque
Wechiau Hippo Sanctuary

Demographics
The Savannah Region has a low population density, and along with the official language of English, most inhabitants speak a language of the Oti–Volta subfamily in the Niger–Congo language family, such as Gonja,  Vagla, Dagbani, Mamprusi, or Tamprusi.

Religion 
A majority of residents in the Savanna Region identify as Muslim.

Educational institutions 

 Bole Senior High School
 Buipe Senior High School
 Damongo Senior High School
 Salaga Senior High School
 Sawla Senior High School
 Daboya Community Day Senior High School

Administrative divisions
The political administration of the region is through the local government system. Under this administration system, the region is divided into seven MMDA's (made up of 0 Metropolitan, 2 Municipal and 5 Ordinary Assemblies). Each District, Municipal or Metropolitan Assembly, is administered by a Chief Executive, representing the central government but deriving authority from an Assembly headed by a presiding member elected from among the members themselves. The current list is as follows:

Famous citizens

References

External links
 GhanaDistricts.com – Northern Region
 
 GhanaDistricts.com

Savannah Region (Ghana)
Regions of Ghana